Eriocharis lanaris is a species of beetle in the family Cerambycidae. It was described by Blanchard in 1874.

References

Trachyderini
Beetles described in 1874